Nikola Jokišić (born 7 February 1971) is a retired footballer who played as a forward for clubs in Yugoslavia, Greece, Sweden, Portugal and Hungary. He is a FIFA-licensed player's agent.

Club career
Born in Mostar, SR Bosnia and Herzegovina, then still within Yugoslavia, Nikola Jokišić began playing football with FK Velež Mostar, making 34 appearances in the Yugoslav First League. He would also play for FK Vojvodina before moving abroad.

Nikola Jokišić joined Greek second division side Proodeftiki F.C. for the 1992–93 and 1993–94 seasons. In early 1994, he would play in the Swedish top division with IFK Norrköping and BK Häcken. He joined to Portuguese second division side C.F. União for two seasons, before moving to lower divisions of Portuguese football. In 2003, he played for Hungarian first division side Pécsi Mecsek FC.

References

External links
 https://web.archive.org/web/20140326104214/http://bhfudbal.ba/ino-fudbal/zanimljivosti-ostalo/item/9209-ekskluzivno-vladavi%C4%87-prona%C5%A1ao-novi-klub.html 
 https://web.archive.org/web/20140324094721/http://sport24.ba/index.php/fudbal/transferi/item/8479-milan-vignjevic-karijeru-nastavlja-na-malti 
 https://web.archive.org/web/20140324111734/http://sport24.ba/index.php/fudbal/transferi/item/8486-filip-stojanovic-potpisao-ugovor-sa-naxxar-lionsima 
 https://web.archive.org/web/20140326105536/http://www.avaz.ba/sport/fudbal/vignjevic-karijeru-nastavlja-u-portugalu 
 Vignjević karijeru nastavlja u Portugalu!?
 Vignjević blizu Portugala, Vladimir Nestorović, Sportske.net, 15 March 2014

1971 births
Living people
Association football wingers
Yugoslav footballers
Bosnia and Herzegovina footballers
FK Velež Mostar players
FK Vojvodina players
Proodeftiki F.C. players
IFK Norrköping players
BK Häcken players
FC Dinamo București players
C.F. União players
CD Ribeira Brava players
Pécsi MFC players
Yugoslav First League players
Football League (Greece) players
Allsvenskan players
Liga Portugal 2 players
Nemzeti Bajnokság I players
Bosnia and Herzegovina expatriate footballers
Expatriate footballers in Greece
Bosnia and Herzegovina expatriate sportspeople in Greece
Expatriate footballers in Sweden
Bosnia and Herzegovina expatriate sportspeople in Sweden
Expatriate footballers in Romania
Bosnia and Herzegovina expatriate sportspeople in Romania
Expatriate footballers in Portugal
Bosnia and Herzegovina expatriate sportspeople in Portugal
Expatriate footballers in Hungary
Bosnia and Herzegovina expatriate sportspeople in Hungary
Association football agents